Asura congerens is a moth of the family Erebidae first described by Felder in 1874. It is found in India's north-western Himalayas and Sikkim.

References

congerens
Moths described in 1874
Moths of Asia